The Virginia Randolph Cottage, now the Virginia E. Randolph Museum, is a museum at 2200 Mountain Road in Glen Allen, Virginia.  The museum is dedicated to the history of Virginia E. Randolph (1874–1958), an African-American vocational educator in the area for 55 years.  The building, built in 1937 and housing Randolph's home economics classrooms, was declared a National Historic Landmark in 1974 in recognition of her legacy as a trainer of vocational teachers; her remains are interred on the grounds.

Description and history
The Virginia Randolph Museum is located east of Glen Allen, on the north side of Mountain Road, just east of the main buildings of the Academy at Virginia Randolph, part of the Henrico County public schools.  The museum building is a single-story brick house, with a gabled roof pierced by three dormers.  It is not architecturally distinctive, and its interior has been partitioned to better serve its present purpose as a museum.  It was built in 1937 with federal funding assistance.

Virginia E. Randolph was born to former slaves, and made her early career as an educator.  In 1908 she was chosen by the Henrico County supervisor to  develop a model program of training and supervision for vocational teachers.  Under the auspices of the Jeanes Foundation, the methods and plans developed by Virginia Randolph in Henrico County eventually achieved internationally widespread adoption.

Randolph also continued to teach in the Henrico County schools until her retirement in 1949.  The home economics building, where she is said to have had an office, continued to be used as a teaching facility until 1969-70, and was then converted by the county into a museum in Randolph's honor.  Randolph is buried in a grave nearby.

See also
List of National Historic Landmarks in Virginia
National Register of Historic Places listings in Henrico County, Virginia

References

External links

Virginia Randolph Museum - Henrico County Parks
Virginia Randolph Cottage, Henrico County, one photo at Virginia DHR

The Museum In Memory Of Virginia E. Randolph
TV Interview about the museum

School buildings on the National Register of Historic Places in Virginia
National Historic Landmarks in Virginia
Museums in Henrico County, Virginia
Houses completed in 1937
Education museums in the United States
African-American museums in Virginia
Randolph, Virginia
Colonial Revival architecture in Virginia
Women's museums in the United States
National Register of Historic Places in Henrico County, Virginia
Historic American Buildings Survey in Virginia